The Anne Murray Centre is located in Springhill, Nova Scotia exploring the history of the singer, Anne Murray.

The 6,894 square foot building houses exhibits and artifacts, gift shop and multi-use rooms. The centre is opened from mid-May to mid-October and has had 400,000 visitors since July 28, 1989.

See also 
 List of music museums

References

External links
 Anne Murray Centre

Museums in Cumberland County, Nova Scotia
Biographical museums in Canada
Music museums
Music organizations based in Canada